Kimberly Godwin is an American television executive. In April 2021, Godwin was named president of ABC News making her the first Black woman to lead a major American broadcast news network.

Education 
Godwin graduated from Florida A&M with a degree in broadcast journalism.

Career 
Godwin has held newsroom-leadership roles in various cities including New York, Los Angeles, Dallas, Philadelphia and Cleveland.

Godwin joined CBS News in 2007. While with the network, she served as senior broadcast producer of CBS Evening News, executive director for development and diversity, and executive vice president of News.

In April 2021, Godwin was named president of ABC News. She is the first Black woman to lead a major American network's broadcast news division.

Awards 
Godwin has won six National News and Documentary Emmy Awards, two Edward R. Murrow Awards, an Alfred I. DuPont-Columbia Award, a Sigma Delta Chi Award, and the National Association of Black Journalists' Ida B. Wells Award.

References

External links 

 

Living people
Women television executives
American television executives
Florida A&M University alumni
Year of birth missing (living people)
Presidents of ABC News
21st-century American businesswomen
21st-century American businesspeople
African-American business executives